The Four Comprehensives, or the Four-pronged Comprehensive Strategy is a list of political goals for China, put forward by Xi Jinping, General Secretary of the Chinese Communist Party (CCP) in 2014. They are:

 Comprehensively build a moderately prosperous society
 Comprehensively deepen reform
 Comprehensively govern the nation according to law
 Comprehensively strictly govern the Party.

Some scholars argue that there are the same or very similar statements of the "four comprehensives" in Deng Xiaoping Theory.

Comprehensively build a moderately prosperous society (Xiaokang society)

The term "moderately prosperous society" dated back to 1979, when Chinese leader Deng Xiaoping said to visiting Japanese Prime Minister Masayoshi Ōhira that "Xiaokang society was the goal of Chinese modernization".

In 1997, the term "building a moderately prosperous society" was officially adopted in General Secretary Jiang Zemin's report to the 15th CCP National Congress.

In 2002, the term was changed to "comprehensively building a moderately prosperous society" in the report to the 16th CCP National Congress.

In 2012, "Completing the Building of a Moderately Prosperous Society in All Respects" was first introduced in Hu Jintao's report to the 18th CCP National Congress.

Timeline 

The Four Comprehensives have been developed incrementally during the early years of Xi's tenure:

 November 2012: "Comprehensively build a moderately prosperous society" put forward at the 18th Party Congress
 November 2013: "Comprehensively deepen reform" put forward at the 3rd Central Committee Plenum
 early October 2014: "Comprehensively strictly govern the Party" put forward at the summary meeting of the Mass Line Campaign
 late October 2014: "Comprehensively govern the nation according to law" put forward during the 4th Central Committee Plenum
 November 2014: "Three Comprehensives" (absent the Party governance clause) formulated as a strategic bundle during Xi's tour of Fujian Province
 December 2014: "Three Comprehensives" amended to "Four Comprehensives" during Xi's tour of Jiangsu Province
 February 2015: Four Comprehensives unveiled as official Party and national strategy in advance of the Lianghui, the annual sessions of China's National People's Congress and the Chinese People's Political Consultative Conference

See also 
 Ideology of the Chinese Communist Party

References 

Ideology of the Chinese Communist Party
Xi Jinping